West Ham Bombers may refer to:

Romford Bombers
West Ham Hammers